Albert Costa was the defending champions, but chose to compete at Cincinnati in the same week.

Félix Mantilla won the title by defeating Magnus Gustafsson 6–4, 6–1 in the final.

Seeds

Draw

Finals

Top half

Bottom half

References

External links
 Official results archive (ATP)
 Official results archive (ITF)

San Marino CEPU Open
1997 ATP Tour